Tom (Thomas) Willighan (22 March 1903 - 7 July 1936) was an Irish full-back football player. He was capped twice for the Ireland national football team (Northern Ireland), played five seasons for Burnley FC and won leagues and cups during his early days in his hometown of Belfast.

Early Days 

Tom Willighan began his playing career in Belfast for Forth River FC, St Mary's FC and Willowfield FC.

He was captain of the St. Mary's team that won the Steel and Sons Cup in the 1925-26 season, beating Summerfield 4-0 in the final.

After moving to Willowfield FC, he again tasted victory in the Steel and Sons in 1927-28, beating Ormiston 2-1 in a final replay. This was a remarkable season for the club as they won the Irish Cup that year, becoming the first from outside the Irish League to win the Irish Cup since the League's formation in 1890. They defeated Larne 1-0 in the final at Windsor Park.  Also that season, Willowfield won the Irish Intermediate League and Irish Intermediate Cup.

Burnley 

He moved to English First Division side Burnley in January 1928 and made his debut against Manchester United in March 1930. However, the team finished in 21st place and were relegated down to the Second Division. He was a strong, robust defender and made sixty-one appearances over a further four seasons for the Lancashire club. His professional career ended in May 1934 after suffering a serious leg injury playing against Manchester United at Old Trafford. Willighan never properly recovered from the injury and returned home to Belfast where he joined Linfield.

International 

Willighan twice represented Ireland (now known as Northern Ireland).  On 7 December 1932, he was a defender in the 4-1 defeat to Wales at Wrexham and on 16 September 1933 he was in the starting XI that beat Scotland 2-1 in Glasgow.

Personal life 

Tom Willighan was the third of ten children born in Cambrai Street, Belfast. He married Alice Bradshaw in Burnley in 1934 and witness to their wedding were Burnley team-mate and best friend George Waterfield, along with wife Nellie. After retiring from professional football he and his wife moved to Belfast for a short time before returning to Burnley in 1936 just before the birth of his son.

Willighan died from cancer on 7 July 1936 at the age of 33.

External links

Clarets Mad - Tom Willighan's caps
Willighan Family History

1903 births
1936 deaths
Irish association footballers (before 1923)
Pre-1950 IFA international footballers
Burnley F.C. players
Linfield F.C. players
Association footballers from Belfast
Association football fullbacks